trans,trans,trans-(1,5,9-Cyclododecatriene)nickel(0) a organonickel compound with the formula NiC12H18, better known as t-Ni(cdt). It is a 16-electron coordination complex featuring trigonal planar nickel(0) bound to the three alkene groups in the cyclododecatriene ligand. X-ray structural analysis demonstrates that the three olefins adopt a propeller-like arrangement around the nickel atom center, making the structure chiral. This extremely air-sensitive deep red solid was the first discovered Ni(0)-olefin complex.

Preparation and properties 
The complex is prepared by reduction of anhydrous nickel(II) acetylacetonate in ether in the presence of the triolefin:
Ni(acac)2 + t-cdt + 2 Et2AlOEt → t-Ni(cdt) + 2 acacAlOEt + 2 C2H5•

σ-Donating ligands such as carbon monoxide, isonitriles, phosphines, and hydrides can readily add onto t-Ni(cdt) to furnish tetrahedral 18-electron nickel complexes. It has been demonstrated that this fourth coordination site can be leveraged to separate the t-Ni(cdt) enantiomers with recrystallization of diastereomeric 18-electron t-Ni(cdt)L* complexes (where L* = optically active dimethylmenthylphosphine ligand).

Applications 
The all-trans-(cdt) ligand has been shown to be easily displaced with olefins such as trans-cyclooctene, ethylene, all-cis-(cdt), norbornene, to give the corresponding colorless 16-electron Ni(0)-olefin complexes with coplanar geometry. Ni(cod)2 can also be easily prepared from Ni(cdt).

Recently, it was demonstrated that t-Ni(cdt) can be used to synthesize unique air-stable 16-electron Ni(0)–olefin complexes, such as Ni(Fstb)3 and Ni(4-tBustb)3 using (E)-stilbene ligands.

References

Organonickel compounds
Cyclic compounds
Alkene complexes